High-speed rail in Czech Republic is at planning stage only. Czech rolling stock manufacturer Škoda Transportation produces high-speed rolling stock on regular basis.

Infrastructure 

Several studies of a possible network have been completed, but there have not yet been any concrete proposals. There are no expectations for any operation before 2020, but Czech railway infrastructure manager (Správa železnic, SŽ) has a special budget for preparatory studies. There is also promotion from the side of NGOs, e.g. Centrum pro Efektivní Dopravu.

In 2017, the Government of the Czech Republic approved the High-Speed Rail Development Program. According to this program following routes will be developed:

 RS1 - Prague - Brno - Ostrava - (Katowice)
 RS2 - Brno - Břeclav - (Vienna/Bratislava)
 RS3 - Prague - Plzeň - (Munich)
 RS4 - Prague - Ústí nad Labem - (Dresden)
RS5 - Prague - Liberec/Hradec Králové - (Wrocław)

New high-speed routes will consist of the following shorter sections:

In 2018 SŽDC identified following three shorter sections as pilot projects:

 VRT Polabí (HST Polabí) - Prague - Poříčany (30 km) - part of future RS1 and RS5
 VRT Jižní Morava (HST South Moravia) - Brno - Vranovice - part of future RS2
 VRT Moravská brána (HST Moravian Gate) - Přerov - Ostrava - part of future RS1

Along the high-speed route RS1 (Prague-Brno-Ostrava), several new train stations are planned. Just south to the D11 motorway in the town of Nehvizdy in the Prague-East District, the new Prague East Terminal (Terminál Praha východ) is being planned. This station will be a transport hub as a part of the RS1 and RS5 (Prague-Liberec/Hradec Králové) routes and will mainly serve residents of the northeastern part of the Central Bohemian Region. Along RS1, the high-speed line will be connected via a branch line to the train station of Světlá nad Sázavou, which will be reconstructed. Close to highway exit 112 on the D1 motorway in the Jihlava District, a new Jihlava train station (terminál Jihlava VRT) is planned as part of RS1. This station will also be connected to the regional railway between Jihlava and Havlíčkův Brod and serve as a transport hub for the Vysočina Region. Another new station to the west of Velká Bíteš is planned on a branch line from the RS1 towards the regional railway between Havlíčkův Brod and Brno. In the south of Brno, the new train station Brno-Vídeňská is planned to serve the region around Brno and to prevent unnecessary traffic to Brno main railway station in the city centre.

One new train station is planned along the high-speed route RS4 (Prague - Ústí nad Labem). This new train station (Terminál Roudnice nad Labem VRT) will be constructed to the west of Roudnice nad Labem and will serve as a transfer hub in the Litoměřice District.

Rolling stock operated in the Czech Republic 

Since 2004 České dráhy have been operating seven ČD Class 680 sets. In reality ČD Class 680 were never operated in Germany and appeared only in Austria and Slovakia; since 2012 they have only operated on domestic routes and in Slovakia.

Rolling stock manufactured in the Czech Republic 

These were designated as Chs200 (ЧС200) and were used mainly on the Nevsky Express train on the Moscow – Saint Petersburg Railway.

Future rolling stock 
First step in modernizing its fleet, and preparing for opening of current modernized lines and future high-speed lines with speeds exceeding 200 km/h, České dráhy issued a tender of procuring new rolling stock that would meet its demand and bring more comfort for passengers. In 2021 the consortium of Siemens Mobility and Škoda Transportation has won the tender for 20 Viaggio Comfort non-traction units with eight passenger cars and a passenger control car, enabling push-pull operation.

The cars will be approved for operation in the Czech Republic and neighboring European countries such as Germany, Austria, Slovakia, Hungary, and Poland.

References 

High-speed rail in the Czech Republic
Passenger rail transport in the Czech Republic